The Pale is a river in Viljandi County, Estonia.

External links
Profile in Keskkonnainfo.ee
Profile in EELIS

Rivers of Estonia
Landforms of Viljandi County